Elzira de Fátima Borges Tavares Barros (born May 13, 1980 in Benguela), is a former Angolan handball player. Elzira represented Angola at the 2004 Summer Olympic Games in Athens, where Angola finished 9th. She also participated in the 2009 World Women's Handball Championship in Beijing. She participated at the 2011 World Women's Handball Championship in Brazil.

She is married to Angolan basketball player Mílton Barros.

She last played for Angolan side Primeiro de Agosto.

References

External links

1980 births
Living people
People from Benguela
Angolan female handball players
Olympic handball players of Angola
Handball players at the 2004 Summer Olympics
African Games gold medalists for Angola
African Games medalists in handball
Competitors at the 2011 All-Africa Games